Prince Vladimir Georgievich Kantakuzen (- 16 July 1937) was a Russian major general who saw action in the Russo-Japanese War and the First World War.

Biography 
Vladimir Kantakuzen was descended from the noble Romanian Cantacuzino family in Bessarabia Governorate: son of George Grigorievich Kantakusen.

Kantakuzen graduated from the 4th Moscow Cadet Corps (1892) and Mikhailovsky Artillery School (1895), was graduated lieutenant in the 15th cavalry artillery battery.

Ranks: lieutenant (1897), staff-captain (1901), podyesaul (1902), yesaul (1905), captain (1905), lieutenant colonel (1909), colonel (1915), major general (1917).

He was transferred to the 3rd Transbaikal Cossack battery. As part of it participated in Russian-Japanese War, also fought in the 1st Frontier Zaamursky cavalry regiment, the 4th battery of 1st Siberian Rifle Artillery Brigade.

After the war he was returned to the 15th Cavalry Artillery Battery. Commanded the 2nd reserve infantry battery (1908-1909), the 19th cavalry artillery battery (since 1909).

In First World War he commanded the 9th cavalry division, served as inspector of artillery of the 2nd Cavalry Corps (Russia) (1914-1917). He was awarded the order of St. George 4th degree

and St. George's Arms

Participated in the White Movement in Siberia. Commanded the 2nd Ufa Cavalry Division (September 1919-March 1920). Participated in the Great Siberian Ice March.

After the end of the Russian Civil War emigrated to France. In 1921 he participated in the Reichenhall monarchist congress. He was a member of the Association of Cavalry Artillery. Then moved to Romania, died in Bessarabia.

Awards 
 Order of St. Stanislaus 3d class with swords and bow (1904);
 Order of St. Anna 3d class with swords and bow (1904);
 Order of St. Stanislaus, 2nd Class, with swords and bow (1907);
 Order of St. George 4th class (VP 03.02.1915);
 Order of St. George, 4th Class (GP 09.03.1915).

Notes

References

Sources 
 

1872 births
1937 deaths
People from Bessarabia Governorate
Recipients of the Order of St. George of the Fourth Degree
Recipients of the Order of St. Anna, 3rd class
Recipients of the Order of Saint Stanislaus (Russian), 2nd class
Recipients of the Order of Saint Stanislaus (Russian), 3rd class
Imperial Russian major generals
Vladimir Georgievich
Russian military personnel of the Russo-Japanese War
Russian military personnel of World War I
White movement generals
White Russian emigrants to France
White Russian emigrants to Romania
Russian people of Romanian descent
Monarchists from the Russian Empire